Cobquecura is a commune in the Region of Ñuble  (Spanish: comuna) in the Province of Itata Chile's Region of Ñuble.

Demographics
Of these, 1,493 (26.3%) lived in urban areas and 4,194 (73.7%) in rural areas. Between the 1992 and 2002 censuses, the population fell by 9.1% (570 persons).

Administration
As a commune, Cobquecura is a third-level administrative division of Chile administered by a municipal council, headed by an alcalde who is directly elected every four years. The 2008-2012 alcalde is Julio Manuel Fuentes Alarcón (PRSD).The municipal council has the following members:
 Luis Enrique Rodríguez Alarcón (PS)
 Lautaro Igor Millanao Mora (PDC)
 Guillermo Salgado Contreras (ILF)
 Jacqueline Elizabeth Pacheco Alacón (RN)
 Temistocle Vera Irribarra (PRSD)
 Jose Pedro Cifuentes Crisostomo (RN)

Within the electoral divisions of Chile, Cobquecura is represented in the Chamber of Deputies by Jorge Sabag (PDC) and Frank Sauerbaum (RN) as part of the 42nd electoral district, together with San Fabián, Ñiquén, San Carlos, San Nicolás, Ninhue, Quirihue, Treguaco, Portezuelo, Coelemu, Ránquil, Quillón, Bulnes, Cabrero and Yumbel. The commune is represented in the Senate by Alejandro Navarro Brain (MAS) and Hosain Sabag Castillo (PDC) as part of the 12th senatorial constituency (Biobío-Cordillera).

Notable residents 
Cobquecura is the birthplace of many significant Chilean figures, including:
 Mariano Latorre (1886-1955) Writer of Basque descent. He won the Chilean National Prize for Literature in 1944.
 Fidel Sepulveda Llanos (1936-2006) Poet, Researcher, Spanish and literary aesthetics Professor, PhD in Hispanic Philology for the Complutense University of Madrid and Member of the Chilean Academy of Language

References

External links
  Municipality of Cobquecura

Communes of Chile
Populated places established in 1575
Populated places in Itata Province
Coasts of Ñuble Region
Populated coastal places in Chile
South American sea lion colonies
1575 establishments in the Spanish Empire